Harper's Mill is a building located on Tom Sawyer Island at Disneyland, Walt Disney World Resort's Magic Kingdom and Tokyo Disneyland. All three have different, distinct appearances, but all of them feature a water wheel attached to, or near the building. They are all named after the character, "Joe Harper", from The Adventures of Tom Sawyer and The Adventures of Huckleberry Finn. 

The official name of the mill at Disneyland is Harper's Cider Mill and serves as part of the stage for the nighttime show Fantasmic!.

Inside the mill at the Magic Kingdom in Walt Disney World there is a depiction of a scene from Disney's The Old Mill. The gears inside the mill also "creak" to the tune of "Down by the Old Mill Stream".

Lafitte's Tavern 
When Tom Sawyer Island at Disneyland was updated and themed to Pirates of the Caribbean in early 2007, Harper's Mill became Lafitte's Tavern presumably named after Lafitte's Landing from the Pirates of the Caribbean attraction (which in turn was named after the pirate Jean Lafitte). The Fantasmic! stage in front of the mill is used for a pirate show during the day.

Walt Disney Parks and Resorts attractions
Mark Twain